Rubén Ramiro Pastor (born 16 April 1993) is a Spanish footballer who plays for Real Ávila CF as a striker.

Club career
Born in Madrid, Ramiro joined his hometown club Rayo Vallecano's youth system at the age of ten. He made his first senior appearances with the B-side, in Segunda División B.

On 2 September 2012 Ramiro made his first-team – and La Liga – debut, playing 27 minutes in a 0–0 home draw against Sevilla FC. On 18 July 2015 he moved to another reserve team, Celta de Vigo B also in the third tier.

On 4 July 2016, Ramiro joined Real Ávila in Tercera División.

References

External links

1993 births
Living people
Footballers from Madrid
Spanish footballers
Association football forwards
La Liga players
Segunda División B players
Tercera División players
Rayo Vallecano B players
Rayo Vallecano players
Celta de Vigo B players